Lewisburg Armory is a historic National Guard armory located at East Buffalo Township, Union County, Pennsylvania.  It was built in 1938, and is an "I-plan" building consisting of a two-story administration section with one-story wings, 1 1/2-story drill hall, and 2-story stable.  The building is built of brick and concrete block and executed in the Moderne style. The administration section has a hipped roof, the drill hall an arched roof, and stable a flat roof.

It was added to the National Register of Historic Places in 1991.

References

Armories on the National Register of Historic Places in Pennsylvania
Moderne architecture in Pennsylvania
Infrastructure completed in 1938
Buildings and structures in Union County, Pennsylvania
National Register of Historic Places in Union County, Pennsylvania
1938 establishments in Pennsylvania